Narsarsukite is a rare silicate mineral with either the chemical formula  or .

It was first described in 1900 for an occurrence in the Narsarsuk pegmatite in the Ilimaussaq intrusive complex of West Greenland. It has also been reported from a syenite which intruded limestone in the Sweetgrass Hills, Montana, and within hornfels and marble xenoliths in the alkalic intrusive of Mont Saint-Hilaire, Quebec. It occurs associated with aegirine, microcline, albite, elpidite, epididymite, taeniolite, pectolite, calcite, galena and quartz.

References

Inosilicates
Tetragonal minerals
Minerals in space group 87